In geometry, the rhombitetraoctagonal tiling is a uniform tiling of the hyperbolic plane. It has Schläfli symbol of rr{8,4}. It can be seen as constructed as a rectified tetraoctagonal tiling, r{8,4}, as well as an expanded order-4 octagonal tiling or expanded order-8 square tiling.

Constructions 
There are two uniform constructions of this tiling, one from [8,4] or (*842) symmetry, and secondly removing the mirror middle, [8,1+,4], gives a rectangular fundamental domain [∞,4,∞], (*4222).

Symmetry 
A lower symmetry construction exists, with (*4222) orbifold symmetry. This symmetry can be seen in the dual tiling, called a deltoidal tetraoctagonal tiling, alternately colored here. Its fundamental domain is a Lambert quadrilateral, with 3 right angles. 

With edge-colorings there is a half symmetry form (4*4) orbifold notation. The octagons can be considered as truncated squares, t{4} with two types of edges. It has Coxeter diagram , Schläfli symbol s2{4,8}. The squares can be distorted into isosceles trapezoids. In the limit, where the rectangles degenerate into edges, an order-8 square tiling results, constructed as a snub tetraoctagonal tiling, .

Related polyhedra and tiling

References
 John H. Conway, Heidi Burgiel, Chaim Goodman-Strass, The Symmetries of Things 2008,  (Chapter 19, The Hyperbolic Archimedean Tessellations)

See also

Square tiling
Tilings of regular polygons
List of uniform planar tilings
List of regular polytopes

External links 

 Hyperbolic and Spherical Tiling Gallery
 KaleidoTile 3: Educational software to create spherical, planar and hyperbolic tilings
 Hyperbolic Planar Tessellations, Don Hatch

Hyperbolic tilings
Isogonal tilings
Uniform tilings